Gary Joseph Pratt (born 22 December 1981) is an English cricketer and footballer, best known for running out the Australia cricket captain Ricky Ponting during the England 2–1 win in the 2005 Ashes series. Pratt is primarily a left-handed batsman but also bowls right-arm off breaks.

Pratt performed well in his early career, picking up the NBC Denis Compton Award in 1999 as the most promising young player at Durham County Cricket Club, and scored a century for England Under 19s. He stayed on at Durham, scoring more than 1000 first-class runs in 2003. Pratt has failed to match that form since. He did not play a single first-class game in 2005 (although he famously appeared as a substitute fielder for England) and in August 2006, Durham announced that they had decided not to renew Pratt's contract. He has since appeared for Crook Town F.C. in a Northern League Division Two fixture against Brandon United F.C. He signed for Cumberland minor county cricket club for the 2007 cricket season.

Statistics and records
Pratt's best year as a first-class cricketer was undoubtedly 2003, when he scored 1,055 runs. His highest score in first-class cricket is 150, achieved while batting for Durham against Northamptonshire at the Riverside Ground in 2003. His highest one-day score is 101*, achieved for Durham versus Somerset at Taunton in 2003.

Ponting run out
Pratt is most famous for his run out of Australian captain Ricky Ponting at Trent Bridge in the 2005 Ashes series. Brought on to field as a substitute, Pratt was fielding at cover when Damien Martyn tapped the ball in his direction and attempted a quick single. Pratt duly threw down the stumps at the striker's end with Ponting considerably short of his ground. This moment is remembered as one of the most important turning points during the series, with Ponting looking well set for a big score at the time. The dismissal prompted an angry outburst from the batsman, who was seen shouting up at the England balcony towards Duncan Fletcher, unhappy at England's frequent use of substitute fielders during the series. Ironically, although England may have used substitute fielders to rest bowlers between spells, this appearance by Pratt was not among them: he was replacing Simon Jones, who had been taken to hospital with an ankle injury; it was to be Jones' last test. The run out earned him a place on the open top bus parade following the series victory.

Since the incident, Pratt has acquired a small following of grateful English fans. He had the dubious honour of having the pavilion in Sky Sports' Cricket AM named the 'Gary Pratt Pavilion'. England fan organisation the Barmy Army planned to fly Pratt out to Australia for the 2006–07 Ashes series as a good-luck charm, but failed to find sponsorship for his plane fare.

Pratt felt that the event that thrust him into the cricketing limelight was also the one that quickened his dramatic fall from grace, ignoring his skill with the bat: "I was just known for fielding afterwards, and I didn't really want that."  he was working at a cricketing equipment shop and  skippers Cumberland, where he has scored ten Championship hundreds.

References

External links
 
 England's supersub brought back down to earth, The Guardian.

1981 births
Durham cricketers
English cricketers
English footballers
Living people
Sportspeople from Bishop Auckland
Cricketers from County Durham
Cumberland cricketers
Crook Town A.F.C. players
Durham Cricket Board cricketers
NBC Denis Compton Award recipients
Durham cricket captains
Cumberland cricket captains
Association football forwards
Association football midfielders